Thottavadi is a 1973 Indian Malayalam film, directed by M. Krishnan Nair. The film stars Prem Nazir, Jayabharathi, Adoor Bhasi and Sreelatha Namboothiri in the lead roles. It was distributed by Popular Films. The film had musical score by L. P. R. Varma.

Cast
Prem Nazir as Dr. John
Jayabharathi as Savithri
Adoor Bhasi as Dr. Pushpangadathan
T. R. Omana as Bhagiradiyamma
Kottarakkara Sreedharan Nair as Vaasu/P. V. Pilla
Prem Prakash as Babu
Adoor Pankajam as Kamalamma
Sankaradi as Kuttan Nair
KPAC Lalitha as Gouri
Paravoor Bharathan as Madhavan
Meena as Subhashini
T. S. Muthaiah as Priest
Prem Navas as Pulluvan
Prema as Pulluvathi 
Usharani as Sarasamma

Soundtrack
The music was composed by L. P. R. Varma and the lyrics were written by Vayalar Ramavarma.

References

External links
 

1973 films
1970s Malayalam-language films
Films directed by M. Krishnan Nair